Microlophus koepckeorum, commonly known as Frost's iguana, is a species of lava lizard in the family Tropiduridae. The species is endemic to Peru.

Etymology
The specific name, koepckeorum (genitive plural), is in honor of German-born Peruvian ornithologists Hans-Wilhelm Koepcke and Maria Koepcke, husband and wife.

Reproduction
M. koepckeorum is oviparous.

References

Further reading
Dixon JR, Wright JW (1975). "A Review of the Lizards of the Iguanid Genus Tropidurus in Peru". Contributions in Science, Natural History Museum of Los Angeles County (271): 1-39. (Tropidurus koepckeorum, new status, pp. 28–30, Figure 13, bottom). (in English, with abstracts in English and Spanish).
Frost D, Rodrigues MT, Grant T, Titus TA (2001). "Phylogenetics of the Lizard Genus Tropidurus (Squamata: Tropiduridae: Tropidurinae): Direct Optimization, Descriptive Efficiency, and Sensitivity Analysis of Congruence Between Molecular Data and Morphology". Molecular Phylogenetics and Evolution 21 (3): 352–371. (Microlophus koepckeorum, new combination).
Mertens R (1956). "Studien über die Herpetofauna Perus I. Zur Kenntniss der Iguaniden-Gattung Tropidurus in Peru ". Senckenbergiana Biologica 37: 101–136. (Tropidurus occipitalis koepckeorum, new subspecies, p. 117). (in German).

koepckeorum
Lizards of South America
Reptiles of Peru
Endemic fauna of Peru
Reptiles described in 1956
Taxa named by Robert Mertens